Cumbernauld town centre (known today as The Centre Cumbernauld) is the commercial centre of the new town of Cumbernauld, Scotland. It was designed in the 1950s—as what became known as a megastructure—to be a town centre consisting of "one huge multi-storey building," according to its preliminary planning report, housing shops, apartments, a hotel, ice rink, police station and other amenities.

Phase 1 was completed between 1963 and 1967, and the centre was opened by Princess Margaret and Lord Snowdon in May 1967. It was expanded in 2007 by the addition of the Antonine Centre, a shopping centre that is linked to the older structure by walkways and lifts.

The facility has been subject to harsh criticism over the years. It was voted "Britain's most hated building" in 2005, in a poll organised by Channel 4's programme Demolition, and was twice named Scotland's worst town centre by the Carbuncle Awards. The top section of the building has been dubbed by writers including author Caro Ramsay as the "Alien's Head", due to local people observing a resemblance to fictional character E.T.

In March 2022, North Lanarkshire Council announced plans to demolish the building.

History

Cumbernauld was designated as a new town in December 1955, part of a plan, under the New Towns Act 1946, to move 550,000 people out of Glasgow and into new towns to solve the city's overcrowding. Construction of its town centre began under contractors Duncan Logan, chief architect Leslie Hugh Wilson and architect Geoffrey Copcutt (until 1962 and 1963), and later Dudley Roberts Leaker, Philip Aitken and Neil Dadge.

Phase 1 lasted from 1963 to 1967. The idea was to create a megastructure, in the brutalist style, to accommodate a town of 50,000–80,000 people, although architecture historian John R. Gold notes that the term megastructure was first coined in 1964. Regarded at the time as a "milestone in urban design," the centre would be surrounded by high-density housing without shops or other amenities, with each neighbourhood connected to the structure by pathways so that residents could easily walk there. Architectural critic Wolf von Eckardt wrote in Harper's in 1965:

Leonardo da Vinci, nearly five hundred years ago, envisioned a city where all the vehicles move underground, leaving man to move freely in the sun. Leonardo might also have sketched Cumbernauld's town center, a soaring citadel surrounded by meadow."

Princess Margaret and Lord Snowden opened the centre on 25 May 1967. Built over a dual carriageway, it housed shops, a hotel, ice rink, bowling alley, health centre and penthouse apartments, as well as police, fire and ambulance stations. There was also a library and technical college. Historian Rosemary Wakeman called it a "colossal living vessel" intended to "elicit new codes of community behavior." According to an Open University website, it was a "strange tribute to a moment when it was thought that old cities, with their narrow streets, haphazard layout, and confused, illogical centres were a thing of the past."

Later development

By 1971 the town centre contained the largest supermarket in Scotland and work on phase 2 had begun. The Corporation sought the building of a department store, completed in 1975 as phase 3. It was built for Woolco with two levels of underground parking, and was sold to Gateway in 1986. Asda purchased the site in 1988 and maintained the "Red Balloon Cafe" that was widely implemented in Gateway stores. In the mid-70s the Golden Eagle Hotel closed and was later demolished after a vehicle crashed into the building. Phase 4 was completed in 1981.

The structure was purchased by a shopping management group in 1996 when Cumbernauld Development Corporation was wound up. Phase 3 was demolished in 1996 and in 2001 the rear outdoor section of phase 1 was demolished. The new Antonine Centre was built on those sites in 2006.

In March 2022, North Lanarkshire Council announced that they had reached a deal with the building’s owners to purchase and demolish it in the future.

Gallery

See also
DoCoMoMo Key Scottish Monuments
List of brutalist structures
Prospect 100 best modern Scottish buildings

Notes

References

External links
Official website, archived 9 September 2015.
"Cumbernauld – Town Centre Redevelopment", glasgowarchitecture.co.uk, 9 January 2009.
Model of phase 1 (1963–1967)
Cumbernauld town centre 1966
Model of town centre
"Cumbernauld town centre" poster

Areas of Cumbernauld
Shopping centres in Scotland